Kingstowne is a census-designated place (CDP) in Fairfax County, Virginia, United States. It is a planned community amid the Washington, D.C. suburbs of Springfield, Alexandria, and Franconia, Virginia, and is centered on the intersection of South Van Dorn Street and Kingstowne Boulevard. The population as of the 2020 census was 16,825.

Kingstowne has a town center containing office and retail businesses. The entire community comprises numerous subdivisions containing apartments, condominiums, single-family homes, and townhomes. It began construction in the 1980s through the Halle Companies and is still expanding today in the town center with commercial and office space and in the subdivisions with more single-family homes. Kingstowne has its own ZIP code, 22315, a substation of the Alexandria U.S. Post Office.

Geography
The Kingstowne CDP is in southeastern Fairfax County, bordered to the north and west by Franconia, to the northeast by Rose Hill, to the southeast by Hayfield, to the south by Fort Belvoir, and for a short distance at its southwestern end by Newington.

References

External links
Kingstowne Residential Owners Corporation

Census-designated places in Fairfax County, Virginia
Washington metropolitan area
Planned communities in the United States
Census-designated places in Virginia